Ilana Dupont (née Duff) is a Paralympic athlete from Canada competing mainly in category T53 sprint events.

She competed in the 2008 Summer Paralympics in Beijing, China.  There she won a bronze medal in the women's 100 metres – T53 event, finished fifth in the women's 200 metres – T53 event and finished sixth in the women's 400 metres – T53 event.

After retiring and marrying fellow wheelchair racer Alexandre Dupont, the Canadian made a comeback to para-athletics after watching her husband compete at the 2012 Summer Paralympics in London.

She won a bronze medal in the 100 metres T53 at the 2013 IPC Athletics World Championships in Lyon.

External links
 

Paralympic track and field athletes of Canada
Athletes (track and field) at the 2008 Summer Paralympics
Paralympic bronze medalists for Canada
Year of birth missing (living people)
Living people
Medalists at the 2008 Summer Paralympics
Paralympic medalists in athletics (track and field)
Medalists at the World Para Athletics Championships
Medalists at the 2015 Parapan American Games